Campyloneurum is a genus of ferns in the family Polypodiaceae, subfamily Polypodioideae, according to the Pteridophyte Phylogeny Group classification of 2016 (PPG I). They are commonly known as strap ferns.

Species
, Checklist of Ferns and Lycophytes of the World accepted the following species:

Campyloneurum abruptum (Lindm.) B.León
Campyloneurum acrocarpon Fée
Campyloneurum aglaolepis (Alston) de la Sota
Campyloneurum amazonense B.León
Campyloneurum amphostenon (Kunze ex Klotzsch) Fée
Campyloneurum anetioides (Christ) R.M.Tryon & A.F.Tryon
Campyloneurum angustifolium (Sw.) Fée
Campyloneurum angustipaleatum (Alston) M.Mey. ex Lellinger
Campyloneurum aphanophlebium (Kunze) T.Moore
Campyloneurum asplundii (C.Chr.) Ching
Campyloneurum atlanticum R.C.Moran & Labiak
Campyloneurum austrobrasilianum (Alston) de la Sota
Campyloneurum brevifolium (Lodd. ex Link) Link
Campyloneurum centrobrasilianum Lellinger
Campyloneurum chlorolepis Alston
Campyloneurum chrysopodum (Klotzsch) Fée
Campyloneurum coarctatum (Kunze) Fée
Campyloneurum cochense (Hieron.) Ching
Campyloneurum costatum (Kunze) C.Presl
Campyloneurum decurrens (Raddi) C.Presl
Campyloneurum densifolium (Hieron.) Lellinger
Campyloneurum ensifolium (Willd.) J.Sm.
Campyloneurum falcoideum (Kuhn ex Hieron.) M.Mey. ex Lellinger
Campyloneurum fuscosquamatum Lellinger
Campyloneurum gracile A.Rojas
Campyloneurum inflatum M.Mey. ex Lellinger
Campyloneurum lorentzii (Hieron.) Ching
Campyloneurum macrosorum Fée
Campyloneurum magnificum T.Moore
Campyloneurum major (Hieron. ex Hicken) Lellinger
Campyloneurum nitidissimum (Mett.) Ching
Campyloneurum nitidum (Kaulf.) C.Presl
Campyloneurum oellgaardii B.León
Campyloneurum ophiocaulon (Klotzsch) Fée
Campyloneurum oxypholis (Maxon) Ching
Campyloneurum pascoense R.M.Tryon & A.F.Tryon
Campyloneurum pentaphyllum (Willd.) Pic. Serm.
Campyloneurum phyllitidis (L.) C.Presl
Campyloneurum poloense (Rosenst.) B.León
Campyloneurum repens (Aubl.) C.Presl
Campyloneurum rigidum J.Sm.
Campyloneurum serpentinum (Christ) Ching
Campyloneurum solutum (Klotzsch) Fée
Campyloneurum sphenodes (Kunze ex Klotzsch) Fée
Campyloneurum sublucidum (Christ) Ching
Campyloneurum tenuipes Maxon
Campyloneurum tucumanense (Hieron.) Ching
Campyloneurum vexatum (D.C.Eaton) Ching
Campyloneurum vulpinum (Lindm.) Ching
Campyloneurum wacketii Lellinger
Campyloneurum wurdackii B.León
Campyloneurum xalapense Fée

References

 
Fern genera
Taxa named by Carl Borivoj Presl
Taxonomy articles created by Polbot